Pál Szalay (born 30 June 1892, date of death unknown) was a Hungarian track and field athlete, footballer and football manager.

At the 1912 Summer Olympics he competed in the 100 metres, the 4 × 100 metres relay and the long jump. He represented the sports clubs Kőbánya TE and from 1911 MTK Budapest, becoming Hungarian champion in the 100 and 220 yard sprint events in 1913. He also played football for MTK Budapest from 1910 to 1922, although his career was interrupted by service in World War I.

After retiring as a player and athlete, he was a football manager in Italy for almost three decades.

References

External links
 

1892 births
Year of death missing
Hungarians in Vojvodina
People from Kula, Serbia
Austro-Hungarian military personnel of World War I
Hungarian male sprinters
Hungarian male long jumpers
Athletes (track and field) at the 1912 Summer Olympics
Olympic athletes of Hungary
Hungarian footballers
MTK Budapest FC players
Hungarian football managers
Aurora Pro Patria 1919 managers
U.S. Pistoiese 1921 managers
Parma Calcio 1913 managers
Treviso F.B.C. 1993 managers
Carrarese Calcio managers
Pisa S.C. managers
Hungarian expatriate football managers
Expatriate football managers in Italy
Hungarian expatriate sportspeople in Italy
Association footballers not categorized by position